Harpacticidae is a family of copepods, containing the following genera:

Archizausodes Bouck, Thistle & Huys, 1999
Arpacticus H. Milne-Edwards, 1840
Campella C. B. Wilson, 1924
Discoharpacticus Noodt, 1954
Handiella Brehm, 1924
Harpacticella G. O. Sars, 1908
Harpacticus H. Milne-Edwards, 1840
Mucropedia Bouck, Thistle & Huys, 1999
Neozausodes Bouck, Thistle & Huys, 1999
Paratigriopus Itô, 1969
Perissocope Brady, 1910
Tigriopus Norman, 1869
Zaus Goodsir, 1845
Zausodes C. B. Wilson, 1932
Zausopsis Lang, 1934

References

Harpacticoida
Crustacean families